Composition B, colloquially Comp B, is an explosive consisting of castable mixtures of RDX and TNT.  It is used as the main explosive filling in artillery projectiles, rockets, land mines, hand grenades and various other munitions. It was also used for the explosive lenses in the first implosion-type nuclear weapons developed by the United States.

The standard proportions of ingredients (by weight) are 59.5% RDX (detonation velocity of 8,750 m/s) and 39.5% TNT (detonation velocity of 6,900 m/s), phlegmatized with 1% paraffin wax. Most commonly it is described as 60/40 RDX/TNT with 1% wax added.

Properties 
 Density: 1.65 g/cm3
 Velocity of detonation: 8,050 m/s

Use 
Composition B was extremely common in western nations' munitions and was the standard explosive filler from early World War II until the early 1950s, when less sensitive explosives such as Composition H6 began to replace it in many weapons. M65 bombs from 1953 containing degraded Composition B were responsible for much of the damage in the 1967 USS Forrestal fire.

Some NATO-approved munitions suppliers such as Mecar have continued to use Composition B in their products.

Composition B is related to Cyclotol, which has a higher proportion of RDX (up to 75%).

IMX-101 is slowly replacing Comp B in US military artillery shells, and IMX-104  in mortar rounds and hand grenades.

Gallery

See also 
 Composition C
 Cyclotol
 RE factor
 Semtex

References 

Explosives